Jon Raymond Polito (December 29, 1950 – September 1, 2016) was an American character actor.  In a film and television career spanning 35 years, he amassed over 220 credits. Notable television roles included Detective Steve Crosetti in the first two seasons of Homicide: Life on the Street and as Phil Bartoli on the first season of Crime Story. He also appeared in several films including The Rocketeer, The Crow and Gangster Squad, as well as his work with the Coen brothers. He appeared in five of their films, including Miller's Crossing, Barton Fink and The Big Lebowski. Polito also portrayed legendary "hungry i" nightclub impresario Enrico Banducci in a large supporting role in Tim Burton's 2014 film Big Eyes starring Amy Adams and Christoph Waltz.

Homicide: Life on the Street
Polito was initially reluctant to audition for Homicide as he didn't want to move to Baltimore for the series, having just relocated from New York City to Los Angeles. His agents sent him the script anyway, featuring a dialogue scene between a Polish-American and an Irish-American detective. Polito preferred the Irish detective role, but was told that he could only do the Polish one. After reading for the part Polito added a message on his audition tape saying that if the producers wanted to call him back he would only be interested if he could take the part of the Irish detective. Series co-creators Barry Levinson and Tom Fontana rewrote the character as an Italian named Steve Crosetti and cast him in the role. The Polish detective was also rewritten, becoming Detective Meldrick Lewis, and was played by African-American actor Clark Johnson.

The show was rating poorly and the producers were under pressure from NBC to include a new female character (Megan Russert) in the hope of gaining broader appeal. As a result, they decided to write out Polito's character at the end of Season 2.  Fontana assured him that he would be brought back later in the season, but Polito was unhappy and criticized the producers publicly, an action he later regretted. The outburst caused a rift with Fontana and  the Crosetti character was killed off early in Season 3, with the explanation that the detective had committed suicide. This further infuriated Polito, who again complained to the media, triggering a public slagging match between him and Fontana. Interviewed about the situation in 2005, Polito expressed regret for his handling of the matter. He noted that he and Fontana subsequently patched up their differences, and as a result the Crosetti character returned to make a farewell appearance as a spirit in Homicide: The Movie.

Coen brothers collaboration
Polito was a regular in the Coen brothers movies appearing in five of their films. The Coens had seen Polito in the New York stage adaptation of Death of a Salesman in 1986 playing Howard Wagner. They approached him to play the part of The Dane in Miller's Crossing (1990), but after reading the script he turned them down saying he would only play the Italian gangster Johnny Caspar. The Coens auditioned several other actors but eventually used Polito after they made him read his entire role cold.

He was offered the role of Lou Breeze in their next film Barton Fink (1991), in a role which was written especially for him. Again he turned down the Coens offer saying he wanted to play the part of movie producer Jack Lipnick. Actress Frances McDormand persuaded him to take the role saying it would change his career. He later appeared in The Hudsucker Proxy (1994) as an eccentric businessman, The Big Lebowski (1998) as a private detective and finally in 2001 as a flirtatious salesman in The Man Who Wasn't There.

Awards
Polito won an Obie Award in 1980 for his theater performances off Broadway, and for his lifetime of work in film and television, he received the Maverick Spirit Event Award at Cinequest Film Festival in 2005. In 2012, he won the award for "Best Actor in a Short Film" at Hollywood Reel Independent Film Festival.

Personal life
Polito was born on December 29, 1950, in Philadelphia, Pennsylvania, to John and Delaida "Dee" (née Pompei) Polito. He had an older brother and sister, Rosemary Simpson and Jack Polito, an animator. After acting at the West Philadelphia Catholic High School for Boys, he studied theater at Villanova University.

Polito was gay. He married fellow actor Darryl Armbruster on October 16, 2015, fifteen years after they first met.

He died, at age 65, from multiple myeloma on September 1, 2016, at the City of Hope Hospital, where he was being treated.

Filmography

Film

Television

Video games

References

External links
 
 
 
 Grouchoreviews.com interview with Jon Polito
 Name Dropping with Jason Stuart interview with Jon Polito

1950 births
2016 deaths
20th-century American male actors
21st-century American male actors
Male actors from Philadelphia
American male film actors
American male stage actors
American male television actors
American male video game actors
American male voice actors
American people of Italian descent
Deaths from cancer in California
Deaths from multiple myeloma
American gay actors
LGBT people from Pennsylvania